Sideroxylon rotundifolium is a species of plant in the family Sapotaceae. It is endemic to Jamaica.

References

rotundifolium
Near threatened plants
Endemic flora of Jamaica
Taxonomy articles created by Polbot